Saoud Faraj (Arabic:سعود فرج) (born 6 April 1991) is an Emirati footballer who plays as a winger f.

Career
He formerly played for Al-Jazira, Ittihad Kalba, Al-Shaab, Emirates Club, Ajman, Al Bataeh, Masfout and Al-Hamriyah.

External links

References

1991 births
Living people
Emirati footballers
Al Jazira Club players
Al-Ittihad Kalba SC players
Al-Shaab CSC players
Emirates Club players
Ajman Club players
Al Bataeh Club players
Masfout Club players
Al Hamriyah Club players
UAE Pro League players
UAE First Division League players
Association football wingers
Place of birth missing (living people)